The Governor of Fort William was a British Army officer who commanded the garrison at Fort William in Inverness-shire. The office became a sinecure and was abolished in 1833.

Governors of Fort William
 1725: Charles Sibourg
 1733: George Wade (also Governor of Fort George and Fort Augustus)
 1743: Humphrey Bland
 1752: Richard Onslow
 1759: William Kingsley
 1769: John Burgoyne
 1779: The Hon. John Vaughan
 1780: James Murray
 1794: The Hon. William Harcourt
 1795: Edmund Stevens

Lieutenant-Governors of Fort William
 ... Campbell
 1752: John Leighton
 1764–1804: James Forbes, 16th Lord Forbes
 1804–1812: Donald Macdonald
 1812: Sir James Kempt

References

Fort William
History of the Scottish Highlands